Talk to Me is the first English language album by Brazilian, singer, presenter and actress Xuxa. The album is a compilation of Xuxa's most popular songs in English versions for her TV show - Xuxa - but the material was never released commercially neither in America, nor in Brazil.

Background 
Xuxa is a Brazilian entertainer who made her singing debut in 1985 with the Portuguese language album Xuxa e Seus Amigos. In 1990, she began releasing Spanish music in both North and South America, which was well received.

An English language album for the U.S. market was planned to hit stores in 1994, to coincide with the release of the second season of her English language variety show Xuxa. The album was to consist of 20 English adaptions of her previous Portuguese songs and one new original song, Talk to Me for which the album was named.

Production
For the American television show, Xuxa re-recorded several of her hits in English. The songs have had their length shortened - allegedly a decision by the network so they were not long and tiring. In addition to the hits already known to her Latin fans, Xuxa also recorded an entire new song titled Talk to me, which explicitly made an appeal for the public to be patient in regards to her poor English. The song featured a typical Brazilian sound with drums, also known in her native as "Axé" (ah-sheh).

Most songs have simply added new voice over the instrumental material used in her Spanish and Portuguese versions. In majority most of the lyrics were translations with words carefully chosen not to lose rhyme however songs such as Do Say have turned out completely unrelated to its Portuguese and Spanish counterparts. The opening and closing theme used in the show was Xuxa's Theme (in Portuguese "O Xou da Xuxa Começou").

The songs have only been released on cassette tape.

Availability 
In 1994, the Sony Wonder has acquired domestic home video rights of television series Xuxa, and launched two gift boxes on VHS: Xuxa: Funtastic Birthday Party and Xuxa Celebration! with Cheech Marin.

A counterfeit version of the unreleased CD ripped from old VHS tapes and featuring poor quality for most songs have been found in online shops. It appears that these fake CDs were selling reasonably well until Xuxa Produções (Xuxa's production company) got them removed.

Track listing

Performances 
Many of the tracks from this album were performed on her show, several of them were also released on cassette tapes which were included with the line of Xuxa dolls produced by RoseArt in 1993. Low-quality, unofficial versions of this album have circulated on the market but no official studio version has been released.

References

Xuxa albums
Unreleased albums